Tankersley F.C. was an English association football club based in Tankersley, Barnsley, South Yorkshire.

History
The club was formed around 1910, and competed in the Barnsley Association League right through to its winding up in 1923. They also entered the FA Cup on numerous occasions.

Honours
Barnsley Association League
Champions - 1913/14

Records
Best FA Cup performance: 1st Qualifying Round, 1912–13, 1919–20

References

Defunct football clubs in South Yorkshire
Barnsley Association League
Association football clubs disestablished in 1923